Helmut Bonnet (17 July 1910 – 27 September 1944) was a German athlete. He competed in the men's decathlon at the 1936 Summer Olympics. He was killed in action during World War II.

References

1910 births
1944 deaths
Athletes (track and field) at the 1936 Summer Olympics
German decathletes
Olympic athletes of Germany
People from Spandau
German military personnel killed in World War II
Athletes from Berlin